Inindependence is the second album by the math rock band A Minor Forest, released in 1998.

Critical reception
The Washington Post thought that "A Minor Forest plays arty, (mostly) instrumental rock whose textures and rhythms derive more from German space-rock than from fusion jazz or early '70s British art-rock."

AllMusic wrote that "Inindependence won't go down as a lost classic per se, but there's more here to enjoy than on many a record released as part of the go-nowhere post-rock haze and craze."

Track listing
All songs written and arranged by A Minor Forest.

References

1998 albums
A Minor Forest albums